Anne Kirk (born 6 April 1951) is a Scottish former professional darts player. She was nicknamed "Captain Kirk".

Career

Kirk won the 2001 Women's World Masters, beating American Marilyn Popp in the final. She then reached the semi final of the 2002 Women's World Darts Trophy, beating Trina Gulliver in the quarter finals before losing to Crissy Manley.

Kirk made her World Championship debut in 2003, and defeated Gaynor Williams and Francis Hoenselaar to reach the final where she was defeated by reigning champion Gulliver who made it a hat-trick of wins. She then lost in the quarter finals in 2004 to Karin Krappen and in 2005 to Gulliver.

Kirk qualified for the 2009 Women's World Championship and faced Krappen in the quarter finals, losing 1–2.

World championship results

BDO

 2003: runner-up (lost to Trina Gulliver 0–2) (sets) 
 2004: quarter finals (lost to Karin Krappen 0–2) 
 2005: quarter finals (lost to Trina Gulliver 0–2)
 2009: quarter finals (beat Karin Krappen 1–2)

External links
 Profile and stats on Darts Database

1951 births
Living people
Scottish darts players
People from Castle Douglas
Sportspeople from Dumfries and Galloway
Female darts players
British Darts Organisation players